Baran is a village in the Sool region of Somaliland/Somalia. It is inbetween Las Anod, the regional capital of Sool, and Kalabaydh. The main road that runs from the regional capital to the southeast is named after it. It is primarily inhabited by the Baharsame subclan of the Dhulbahante. In 1906 Baran was made part of the Darwiish grazing ground. It is located a dozen or so kilometers to the west of Weylahed, the second Darwiish capital in 1901.

See also
Administrative divisions of Somaliland
Regions of Somaliland
Districts of Somaliland
Somalia–Somaliland border

References

Populated places in Sool, Somaliland